COCIR is the European Coordination Committee of the Radiological, Electromedical and Healthcare IT Industry. It is a non-profit trade association, which was founded in 1959, and represents the medical technology industry in Europe. Since 2006 COCIR headquarters are located in Brussels. In 2007, Heinrich von Wulfen became its chairman and succeeded Frank Anton. COCIR is a member of the European Medical Devices Industry Group (EMIG).

See also
 DICOM
 Electronic health record
 Electronic medical record
 Health Level 7
 Medical device – Medical technology
 NEMA

References
 COCIR Contribution to Consultation initiated by DG Sanco regarding Community action on health services
 COCIR establishes a desk in China

External links
 COCIR

Health care industry trade groups
Information technology organizations based in Europe
Organizations established in 1959
Trade associations based in Belgium
Health informatics
Medical and health organisations based in Belgium